Lomé Grand Market is a large market place in the city of Lomé, the capital of Togo.
Located near Lomé Cathedral near the city centre, the market often has live African music by local performers.

The market, referred to in French as "Grand Marché" (Main Market) consists of three sections, known locally as Atipoji, Asigame and Assivito. The market occupies an entire city block in Lomé. The majority of the vendors are women and children.

The market offers a wide selection of spices. The most valuable are:

References

Economy of Togo
Lomé
Retail markets in Africa